This is the list of programs broadcast by Yey!, a defunct Philippine children's pay television channel owned by ABS-CBN. Majority of the programs listed below are dubbed in Filipino as the channel was only broadcast in the Philippines.

For the previously aired defunct programs of Yey! channel, see the list of programs previously broadcast by Yey!.

Final programming blocks
Anime series and cartoon programs were divided into various programming blocks.

 All Yey! Anime – The channel's flagship primetime block featuring Japanese anime series intended for all audiences. It was aired every Mondays to Fridays from 5:00 pm to 9:00 pm, and on Saturdays and Sundays from 9:00 pm to 10:00 pm.
 Nickelodeon sa Yey! – The channel's daytime block consisting of cartoons from Nickelodeon and Nick Jr. It was aired every Mondays to Sundays from 9:00 am to 1:00 pm.
 Bibolilits – A morning block that airs selected foreign cartoons intended for pre-schoolers and young children. It was aired every Mondays to Sundays from 6:30 am to 8:30 am.
 Ka-Pow! – A weekday afternoon block consisting of foreign cartoons. It was aired every Mondays to Fridays from 1:00 pm to 3:00 pm.
 Power Hour – A weekend afternoon block consisting of selected live-action series and toys-themed anime series. It was aired every Saturdays and Sundays from 1:00 pm to 3:00 pm.
 Fam-Time – An afternoon block consisting of classic anime series (most of them are from the World Masterpiece Theater anime franchise) every weekdays, with re-runs of selected ABS-CBN programs every weekends, and channel-produced programs that are considered child-friendly and family-oriented. It was aired Mondays to Sundays from 3:30 pm to 5:00 pm.
 Kid Sine – A weekend movie block that was aired from 5:00 pm to 9:00 pm, featuring classic local films every Saturdays and Tagalog-dubbed foreign films every Sundays.

Final programming
Note: The following is the list of programs as of June 30, 2020. Titles are listed in alphabetical order.

Anime series
 Cardcaptor Sakura: Clear Card 
 Digimon Xros Wars 
 Judy Abbott 
 My Hero Academia 
 Naruto 
 Peter Pan and Wendy 
 Samurai X 
 Doraemon (2005 anime)
 Little Lord Fauntleroy (1998 anime; also known as Cedie: Ang Munting Prinsipe)
 Himouto! Umaru-chan 
 Remi, Nobody’s Girl 
 Rascal the Raccoon (1997 anime)

Cartoons
 Adventures of Sonic the Hedgehog 
 Kongsuni and Friends
 Masha and the Bear
 Max Steel 
 Monk 
 Ninjago
 Nutri Ventures 
 Oddbods
 PJ Masks
 Pororo the Little Penguin

Nickelodeon
 Avatar: The Legend of Aang 
 Dora the Explorer 
 Kung Fu Panda: Legends of Awesomeness 
 Rusty Rivets
 Mighty Bug 5 
 SpongeBob SquarePants 
 The Adventures of Jimmy Neutron: Boy Genius 
 The Fairly OddParents 
 The Loud House 
 Harvey Beaks

Local shows
Original program
 Team Yey!

Fantasy
 Super Inggo 
 Wansapanataym

Sitcom
 Goin' Bulilit 

Short segments 
 Balitang Yey!
 Happy Birth-Yey! 
 Kaalaman Express
 KKK: Katampok-tampok, Kamangha-manghang Kaalaman
 Out of the Box by Team Yey!
 Pop Babies
 Tawa Time!
 Team Yey! Timeout
 Whatchuthink?

References

Yey!
Yey!